The city of Melitene (modern Malatya) was an archdiocese of the Syriac Orthodox Church, attested between the ninth and thirteenth centuries but probably founded as early as the seventh century.  More than thirty Syriac Orthodox bishops or metropolitans of Melitene are mentioned either by Michael the Syrian or in other Syriac Orthodox narrative sources.  The archdiocese is last mentioned towards the end of the twelfth century, and seems to have lapsed in the early decades of the thirteenth century.

Bishops and metropolitans of Melitene

Seventh- and eighth-century bishops 
The names of four early Jacobite bishops of Melitene are known.  Michael the Syrian provided a cursory list of 28 undated bishops and metropolitans of Melitene, most of whom were Jacobite bishops consecrated between the ninth and twelfth centuries who featured in his regular lists.  The first five names (Leontius, Otreius, Acacius, Mama and Domitian) were of bishops who flourished before the seventh century.  According to Michael, these men were followed 'long afterwards' by the Jacobite bishops Thomas, Ezekiel, Gregory and Ahron, presumably to be dated to the seventh and eighth centuries.

Ninth- to twelfth-century bishops 
Twenty dated Jacobite metropolitans of Melitene between the ninth and the twelfth centuries are mentioned in the lists of Michael the Syrian.

References

Citations

Bibliography
The main primary source for the Syriac Orthodox metropolitans of Melitene is the record of episcopal consecrations appended to Volume III of the Chronicle of the Syriac Orthodox patriarch Michael the Syrian (1166–99).  In this Appendix Michael listed most of the bishops consecrated by the Syriac Orthodox patriarchs of Antioch between the ninth and twelfth centuries.  Twenty-eight Syriac Orthodox patriarchs sat during this period, and in many cases Michael was able to list the names of the bishops consecrated during their reigns, their monasteries of origin, and the place where they were consecrated.  For the thirteenth century, Michael's lists are supplemented by several references in other Syriac Orthodox narrative sources.

 
 
 Jean-Baptiste Chabot, Chronique de Michel le Syrien, Patriarche Jacobite d'Antiche (1166-1199). Éditée pour la première fois et traduite en francais I-IV (1899;1901;1905;1910; a supplement to volume I containing an introduction to Michael and his work, corrections, and an index, was published in 1924. Reprinted in four volumes 1963, 2010).

Syriac Orthodox dioceses
Oriental Orthodoxy in Turkey

nl:Lijst van Syrisch-orthodoxe aartsbisdommen van Antiochië